Haircut is the ninth studio album by American rock band George Thorogood and the Destroyers, released on July 27, 1993. The first single from the album was "Get a Haircut". The album peaked at No. 120 on the Billboard 200. The band supported the album with a North American tour.

Production
The album was produced by Terry Manning and the Delaware Destroyers. "Want Ad Blues" is a cover of the John Lee Hooker song. "Gone Dead Train" was written by Jack Nitzsche. Thorogood wrote "Baby Don't Go". The album cover art is by Peter Bagge.

Critical reception

The Windsor Star wrote that "the guitar-slinging motor mouth offers another round of stinging and rocking blues, featuring that consistently fat sound with which his band has made its trademark style." The Calgary Herald deemed Haircut "boogie blues and rock 'n' roll ... And, yep, he hasn`t changed a thing." The Colorado Springs Gazette-Telegraph opined that "since shtick is exactly what Thorogood's become reduced to, the only phrase that comes to mind listening to this is, 'get a real job'."

The Canadian Press called it "another slice of devil-may-care, comically anti-authoritarian riff rock." The Boston Globe concluded that "Thorogood doesn't gain any dramatic ground, but his loyalty to his favorite idioms remains genuine." The Indianapolis Star praised the "stark, deliberative" "Killer's Bluze".

Track listing
 "Get a Haircut" (David Avery, Bill Birch) – 4:12
 "Howlin' for My Baby" (Willie Dixon, Howlin' Wolf) – 5:14
 "Killer's Bluze" (Dex Rogers) – 6:10
 "Down in the Bottom" (Dixon) – 4:03
 "I'm Ready" (Dixon) – 3:36
 "Cops and Robbers" (Bo Diddley) – 4:50
 "Gone Dead Train" (Jack Nitzsche, Russ Titelman) – 4:07
 "Want Ad Blues" (John Lee Hooker) – 5:06
 "My Friend Robert" (Patrick Sky) – 2:30
 "Baby Don't Go" (George Thorogood) – 3:24

Personnel
The following personnel are credited on the album:

Musicians
 George Thorogood – guitar, vocals
 Billy Blough – bass guitar
 Hank Carter – keyboards, saxophone, background vocals
 Jeff Simon – drums

Technical
 Delaware Destroyers – producer
 Terry Manning – producer, engineer, mixing
 Bob Ludwig – mastering
 Henry Marquez – art direction
 Peter Bagge – cover art

Charts

References

George Thorogood and the Destroyers albums
1993 albums
Albums produced by Terry Manning
EMI America Records albums